Redcliffe Plantation State Historic Site is a state park  in South Carolina, United States.  Redcliffe Plantation, also known as Redcliffe, completed in 1859, is a Greek Revival plantation house located on the site that is listed on the National Register of Historic Places. The house was designed by the baron Louis Berckmans and was built in 1857.  It was built for James Henry Hammond and was home to three generations of his descendants.  His great-grandson John Shaw Billings, editor of Time, Life, and Fortune magazines, donated the estate and collections to the people of South Carolina in 1973.  The same year it was added to the National Register of Historic Places.

References

External links
Redcliffe Plantation State Historic Site - South Carolina State Parks
Recliffe State Park

Houses on the National Register of Historic Places in South Carolina
South Carolina state historic sites
Protected areas of Aiken County, South Carolina
Historic house museums in South Carolina
Museums in Aiken County, South Carolina
Plantation houses in South Carolina
National Register of Historic Places in Aiken County, South Carolina
Houses in Aiken County, South Carolina
1859 establishments in South Carolina